The Dobrujan Germans were an ethnic German group, within the larger category of Black Sea Germans, for over one hundred years. German-speaking colonists entered the approximately 23,000 km2 area of Dobruja around 1840 and mostly left during the relocation of 1940. Dobruja is a historical region on the west coast of the Black Sea. They are part of the Romanian Germans.

Colonization 

The first of these German settlers came between 1841 and 1856 from the Russian Empire. They were farming families from the neighboring areas of Bessarabia and Cherson, who immigrated because of an economic recession in their home territories. Thirty years later, colonists from Swabia also moved into the region. During this period, Dobruja still belonged to the Ottoman Empire and the colonists were subject to colonization regulations from Turkey. Consequently, the Dobrujan Germans were the only ethnic Germans to ever be Turkish subjects without actually moving to Turkey (as did the Bosporus Germans). They contributed to the agricultural development of the fertile steppes.

Relocation
In the first years of World War II, the majority of the 16,000 Dobrujan Germans, as well as the Bessarabia and Bukovina Germans, were relocated into Germany. This was done under the motto: Heim ins Reich (Home into the Empire). The refugees lived temporarily in relocation camps in Austria, but in 1941/1942 they resettled the German occupied eastern territories in Bohemia, Moravia, and Poland. At the end of the war, they fled west, and were found as refugees in all four occupation zones in Germany.

Footnotes

References
Dobrudscha. In: Handwörterbuch für das Grenz- und Auslandsdeutschtum. Band 2, Breslau. S. 278 - 290.
Petri, Hans: Geschichte der Deutschen Siedlungen in der Dobrudscha. *Hundert Jahre deutschen Lebens am Schwarzen Meere. München 1956.
Sallanz, Josef: Dobrudscha. Deutsche Siedler zwischen Donau und Schwarzem Meer (Potsdamer Bibliothek östliches Europa), Potsdam 2020.
Teutschländer, Willibald: Geschichte der evangelischen Gemeinden in Rümänien. Leipzig 1891, S. 240 f.
Träger, Paul: Die Deutschen in der Dobrudscha. Schriften des deutschen Auslandsinstituts zu Stuttgart (Kulturhistorische Reihe Bd. 6), Stuttgart 1922. New edition in German 2012,

External links 

 Dobruscha.eu

See also
Dobrujan Bulgarians
Volksdeutsche

German diaspora in Europe
Dobruja
Ethnic German groups in Romania
Ethnic groups in Bulgaria